The Secret Life of Pets (Original Motion Picture Soundtrack) is the soundtrack album to the 2016 film of the same name. The film's music is scored by Alexandre Desplat and released on July 1, 2016 by Back Lot Music. The music consisted of jazz, classical and orchestral pieces, which Desplat described the musical style as "George Gershwin meets Miles Davis". The score received positive critical response.

Development 

In December 2015, Desplat was hired to score music for The Secret Life of Pets. In an interview to Entertainment Weekly, Desplat said that "[Director] Chris Renaud showed me some excerpts of the film and they were so funny and beautifully shot that I was already excited, and then we had a chat about music and very quickly we realized that we could go to a territory which I’ve not really explored in movies in America, which is jazz meeting orchestra. For taking place in New York, there was something that felt very right." Despite being a jazz-music lover, he did not find the right project for using jazz music, which he admitted: "I haven't really had an opportunity to really use it in a big scope for cinema, and this was a great option for me to do that. Swing, classical references, jazz, a symphony chorus, humor, tenderness…all these things were there, offered to me."

Initially, Desplat intended to use jazz music, but with the limitation of using only jazz, and wanting to explore several territories, such as melodies and adventurous themes, he decided to add an orchestral music. Desplat brought in an 85-piece orchestral and a 35-member vocal choir, for scoring the film. Desplat said, "At times the score is really full blast with a hundred and more musicians. There is a great electric energy coming from the musicians."

Desplat approached a light-hearted tone for the film, which was felt right, according to Renaud. The notes from the first theme were played on clarinet, by virtuoso Dan Higgins. Desplat said that "This instrument comes back quite often playing the same melody. There is a lightness to it. It's cheeky". When the film transitioned from a fun into moments of danger, sadness and melancholy, Desplat said that the score was a "challenge" and attributed "That's difficult when you are in a genre film where you have been bouncing with very jaunty music all the way [...] How do you end a film without being too sad? This melancholy that you have to find that is not too melancholy. Without being sentimental, but still being moving."

Release 
Entertainment Weekly released the track "Meet the Pets" exclusively from the film, on June 23, 2016. The soundtrack was initially set to be released along with the film, on July 8, but was instead released a week earlier, by Back Lot Music. On October 14, 2016, Desplat conducted the live concert performance of the film's premiere, held at the Hollywood in Vienna annual music gala, in Vienna Concert Hall, Austria, where he would also receive the Max Steiner Film Music Achievement Award.

Reception 
Jonathan Broxton wrote "To get anything out of The Secret Life of Pets you have to have a high tolerance for jazz, a liking for certain world music rhythms, and not be put off by numerous blatant homages to other composers, irrespective of how well they filter through Desplat's own musical sensibility. You also have to be prepared to experience rapid changes in tone, style, orchestration, and pacing, sometimes all within the same cue. Switches from light comedy to romance to full on action and back again are frequent, and unapologetic, and if that sort of emotional musical schizophrenia bothers you, you might want to take a sedative before hitting the play button." James Southall of Movie Wave opined "with all this great stuff, you'd think it would make a great album, but it doesn't – not really.  It's too bitty, if anything there's just too much going on, not enough time to savour any of it.  It's entertaining enough with some really nice highlights, technically it's beyond reproach, and it probably works wonders within the film."

Marcy Donelson of Allmusic wrote "Desplat's musical agility is on full display. Though nearly all of the recording is original score (pop music from the film is not included here), the film and soundtrack close with a cover of "We Go Together" from the musical Grease, performed by workers at a sausage factory that appears earlier in the film." The Denver Post critic called the score as "outstanding", while Screen International-based Wendy Ide called the score as "jaunty" and "keeps up the pace". Jordan Mintzer of The Hollywood Reporter praised the score and attributed that "it takes notes from Breakfast at Tiffany's and other classic Manhattan-set movies, offering up a playful accompaniment to what ultimately feels like a smart but overindulgent exercise in computer-generated puppy love."

Track listing

Personnel 
Credits adapted from CD liner notes

 Production
 Producer – Dominique Lemonnier
 Programmer – Romain Allender
 Recording – Vincent Cirilli, Joel Iwataki
 Mixing – Joel Iwataki, Al Schmitt, Frank Wolf
 Editing – Kenneth Karman, Nevin Seus
 Music supervisor – Rachel Levy
 Technician – Jay Duerr
 Scoring crew – Charlie Paakkari, Dave Martinez, Nick Rives, Paula Salvatore, Jamie Olvera, Richard Wheeler Jr, Ryan Robinson, Tom Hardisty

 Orchestra
 Orchestra contractor – Peter Rotter
 Orchestra conductor – Alexandre Desplat
 Choir conductor and contractor – Jasper Randall
 Concertmaster – Tereza Stanislav
 Orchestrator – Alexandre Desplat, Conrad Pope, Jean-Pascal Beintus, Mark Graham

 Instrumentation
 Bassoon – Damian Montano, Judith Farmer, Kenneth Munday, Samantha Crockett, Rose Corrigan
 Cello – Armen Ksajikian, Cecilia Tsan, Dennis Karmazyn, Eric Byers, Jacob Braun, Paula Hochhalter, Simone Vitucci, Steve Erdody, Timothy Landauer, Trevor Handy, Vanessa Freebairn-Smith, Andrew Shulman
 Clarinet – Stuart Clark, Daniel Higgins
 Drums – Peter Erskine
 Contrabass – Bruce Morgenthaler, Christian Kollgaard, Drew Dembowski, Edward Meares, Geoffrey Osika, Nico Abondolo, Oscar Hidalgo, Stephen Dress, Michael Valerio
 Flute – Alexandre Desplat, Heather Clark, Jennifer Olson, Julie Burkert, Stephen Kujala, Geri Rotella
 Guitar – Dori Caymmi, Timothy May, Andrew Synowiec
 Harp – Marcia Dickstein
 Horn – Benjamin Jaber, David Everson, Dylan Hart, Laura Brenes, Steve Becknell, Teag Reaves, Mark Adams
 Oboe – Chris Bleth, Jessica Pearlman
 Percussion – Alan Estes, Donald Williams, Edward Atkatz, Judith Chilnick, Steven Schaeffer, Wade Culbreath, Gregory Goodall, Paulinho Da Costa, Alex Neciosup-Acuna
 Piano – Alan Steinberger, Thomas Ranier, Randy Kerber
 Saxophone – Brian Scanlon, Jay Mason, Jeff Driskill, Salvadore Lozano, Daniel Higgins
 Trombone – Andrew Martin, William Reichenbach, Phillip Keen, Alexander Iles
 Trumpet – Barry Perkins, Robert Schaer, Jon Lewis
 Tuba – Doug Tornquist
 Vibraphone – Wade Culbreath
 Viola – Alma Fernandez, Darrin McCann, David Walther, Lynne Richburg, Maria Newman, Matthew Funes, Michael Nowak, Robert Brophy, Shawn Mann, Thomas Diener, Victoria Miskolczy, Brian Dembow
 Violin – Alyssa Park, Amy Hershberger, Andrew Bulbrook, Benjamin Powell, Bruce Dukov, Charlie Bisharat, Clayton Haslop, Darius Campo, Dimitrie Leivici, Eun-Mee Ahn, Helen Nightengale, Henry Gronnier, Irina Voloshina, Jacqueline Brand, Jay Rosen, Jessica Guideri, Josefina Vergara, Katia Popov, Kevin Connolly, Lisa Liu, Lisa Sutton, Lorenz Gamma, Maya Magub, Miwako Watanabe, Natalie Leggett, Phillip Levy, Rafael Rishik, Rebecca Bunnell, Roberto Cani, Roger Wilkie, Sarah Thornblade, Serena McKinney, Shalini Vijayan, Tamara Hatwan, Julie Gigante

 Jazz band
 Bass – Mike Valerio
 Trombone – Andrew Martin, Charlie Morillas, Craig Gosnell, Francisco Torres
 Trumpet – Dan Fornero, Bijon Watson, John Fumo, Kye Palmer, Rob Schaer

 Vocals
 Baritone – Abdiel Gonzalez, David Loucks, Eric Bradley, Jim Campbell, Mark Edward Smith, Scott T. Graff, Scott Lehmkuhl, Stephen Grimm
 Bass – Dylan Gentile, Gregory Geiger, Mark Stephen Beasom, Michael T. Geiger, Randy Crenshaw, Reid Bruton, Steven Pence, William Kenneth Goldman
 Tenor – Gerald White, Joseph Golightly, Jon Lee Keenan, Matt Brown, Michael Lichtenauer, Shawn Kirchner, Tim Gonzales

 Marketing and management
 Music business affairs – Kyle Staggs, Tanya Perara
 Executive in charge of music – Mike Knobloch
 Marketing – Nikki Walsh
 Production director – Jake Voulgarides
 Music librarian – Joe Zimmerman, Mark Graham
 Packaging design – Brian Porizek
 Executive producer – Chris Meledandri

Accolades

References 

2016 soundtrack albums
Back Lot Music soundtracks
Animated film soundtracks
Alexandre Desplat soundtracks
2010s film soundtrack albums